PAGE (Page Analysis and Ground truth Elements) is an XML standard for encoding digitised documents. Comparable to ALTO (XML), it allows the organisation and structure of a page and its contents to be described.

PAGE XML can be used to describe :

 page content (regions, lines of text, words, glyphs, reading order, text content, ...)
 the evaluation of the layout analysis (evaluation profiles, evaluation results, ...)
 the cutting of the document image (cutting grids)

The format is developed by the Pattern Recognition & Image Analysis Lab (PRIMA) at the University of Salford in Manchester.

It was designed to be used in conjunction with automatic segmentation and transcription techniques (OCR and HTR): indeed, PAGE aims to support each of the different steps in the processing chain for image document analysis (from image enhancement to layout analysis to OCR).

The PAGE XML schema is notably used as an export and import format by automatic transcription software such as eScriptorium and Transkribus. It is also an export format used by Kraken, a turnkey OCR system optimised for documents in historical and non-Latin scripts.

References

External links 
 Documentation
 Encoding example
 Documentation of the PAGE XML Format for Page Content in the OCR-D project, funded by Deutsche Forschungsgemeinschaft.
 Documentation "Page Content - Ground Truth and Storage"
 Documentation "Evaluation - Metadata, Profile and Results"
 Documentation "Dewarping - Ground Truth and Storage"

XML-based standards
Optical character recognition
Handwriting recognition